The Howlin' Wolf Story – The Secret History of Rock & Roll is a 2003 documentary featured by Mufaro Berejena about the life of blues legend Howlin' Wolf. It features much new and rare material, including Howlin' Wolf performing "How Many More Years?" on the TV musical show Shindig!, introduced by the Rolling Stones, drummer Sam Lay's home movies of stars of the Chicago Blues from the early 1960s, interviews with Howlin' Wolf's family,  Hubert Sumlin, Billy Boy Arnold, Marshall Chess and many others, photographs of Howlin' Wolf and his band through their careers, and much else.

The film was directed by video biographer Don McGlynn, and produced by Joe Lauro, whose company, Historic Films Inc., supplied much of the footage for Martin Scorsese's PBS documentary series on the blues.

References

External links
 
Howlinwolf.com page on the film

Documentary films about blues music and musicians
2003 films